Elizabeth Moutzan-Martinegou (October 1801-November 1832), was a Greek writer from Zakynthos. She has been called the first female writer in modern Greece. She wrote poetry, more than fifteen plays, and works on economics and poetic theory, as well as translating works of classical literature including the Odyssey and Aeschylus' tragedy Prometheus Bound, but her most famous work is her autobiography.

References

 My Story, Moutzan-Martinengou, Elisavet. Published by University of Georgia Press, Baltimore, 1989

1801 births
1832 deaths
19th-century Greek writers
Greek women writers
19th-century women writers